Da Vinci's Inquest is a Canadian undercover cop drama television series, contains seven seasons of thirteen episodes each, for a total of ninety-one episodes. The air dates are given for first airing on CBC Television in Canada.

Series overview

Episodes

Season 1 (1998–1999)

Season 2 (1999–2000)

Season 3 (2000–2001)

Season 4 (2001–2002)

Season 5 (2002–2003)

Season 6 (2003–2004)

Season 7 (2004–2005)

External links
 

Lists of Canadian drama television series episodes
Lists of crime drama television series episodes
Lists of crime television series episodes